Porophyllum linaria (pipicha, pepicha, chepiche) is a sunny short-lived perennial plant  used in Mexican cuisine, where it is often used to flavor meat dishes.  It has a strong taste akin to fresh coriander with overtones of lemon and anise.

In some Mexican markets fresh and dried material is available for sale as a condiment. It is also used as a medicinal herb.

References

Tageteae
Taxa named by Antonio José Cavanilles